The 1956 Arizona State Sun Devils football team was an American football team that represented Arizona State College (later renamed Arizona State University) in the Border Conference during the 1956 NCAA University Division football season. In their second season under head coach Dan Devine, the Sun Devils compiled a 9–1 record (3–1 against Border opponents) and outscored their opponents by a combined total of 306 to 83.

The team's statistical leaders included Dave Graybill with 58 passing yards, Bobby Mulgado with 721 rushing yards, and Gene Mitcham with 256 receiving yards.

Schedule

Roster
HB Bobby Mulgado

References

Arizona State
Arizona State Sun Devils football seasons
Arizona State Sun Devils football